Inge Vermeulen (6 January 1985 – 10 January 2015) was a Brazil-born Dutch field hockey player.

Club career
Vermeulen played as a goalkeeper for HBS and Bloemendaal. In May 2007, she joined SCHC.

International career
Vermeulen made her debut for the Netherlands on 8 April 2008 against Germany and was part of the Dutch national team at the 2009 Women's EuroHockey Nations Championship and the 2009 Women's Hockey Champions Trophy. She won 9 caps and played her final international in 2010.

In her later years Vermeulen played for her country of birth, Brazil.

Vermeulen committed suicide on 10 January 2015, just four days after her 30th birthday.

References

External links

2010 Champions Trophy Profile - Dutch Hockey Federation

1985 births
2015 suicides
Brazilian emigrants to the Netherlands
Dutch female field hockey players
Female field hockey goalkeepers
People from Americana, São Paulo
Suicides in the Netherlands
HC Bloemendaal players
SCHC players